Jill Townsend (born January 25, 1945) is an Anglo-American actress best known for her roles as Elizabeth Chynoweth in Poldark and Dulcey Coopersmith in the 1967 western television series Cimarron Strip.

Life and career
Townsend was born in Santa Monica, California.  Her father, Robert Townsend, a former head of Avis, wrote the bestseller Up the Organization. Her mother was the daughter of Frank Tours, a famous English born musician and conductor whose credits include an association with Irving Berlin.

Jill, who was a debutante, graduated in 1963 from The Master's School in Dobbs Ferry, New York. At that time, she moved to England where she had been accepted into The Royal Academy of Dramatic Arts.

After co-starring with Nicol Williamson in John Osborne's 1965 London stageplay Inadmissible Evidence, she became engaged to Williamson and lived with him for 21 months. However, due to his volatile personality she temporarily split with him at which time she married actor Tom Sutton (68-69). After that brief marriage she reunited with Williamson. They were married from 1971 to 1977. Their son Luke Williamson was born in 1973, but in 1976 she and Nicol Williamson parted temporarily after Townsend began a relationship with Alan Price, her co-star in Alfie Darling.

Townsend ended her acting career in 1985. She studied at the London School of Journalism and worked as a journalist for the Daily Mail, contributing a page for the financial section.  She moved back to the United States in 1989.

She worked as a council trainer and facilitator at Crossroads School, Santa Monica, California and several other schools from 1989 to 1995.

She was on the Board of Directors at Leadership Directories, Inc. starting in 1993, but is no longer serving.

She is currently married to Bob Sorel whom she wed in 1993.

Filmography

Film

Television

References

External links
 

1945 births
Living people
American expatriates in the United Kingdom
American television actresses
American film actresses
Alumni of the London School of Journalism
Actresses from Santa Monica, California
20th-century American actresses
American women journalists
Daily Mail journalists
21st-century American women